The Yirrkala blind snake (Anilios yirrikalae) is a species of snake in the Typhlopidae family.

References

Anilios
Reptiles described in 1942
Snakes of Australia